Unai Iparragirre Azpiazu (born 25 July 1988) is a Basque former professional road bicycle racer. He was born in Azpeitia, Basque Country, and turned professional with Euskadi Fundazioa in 2013. He also competed in track cycling.

Major results
2011
 2nd Madison, National Track Championships (with Unai Elorriaga)
2013
 3rd Overall Tour of China II

References

Cyclists from the Basque Country (autonomous community)
1988 births
Living people
People from Azpeitia
Spanish male cyclists
Spanish track cyclists
Sportspeople from Gipuzkoa